The Stadtmuller House, or F. D. Stadtmuller House, is a historic house built in 1880, and located in the Western Addition neighborhood of San Francisco, California. It is notable for its architecture. 

The Stadtmuller House has been listed as a San Francisco Designated Landmark since December 5, 1970; a listed California Historical Landmark since July 19, 1976; and a National Register of Historic Places listed place since July 19, 1976.

History 
Stadtmuller House is located at 819 Eddy Street, San Francisco, California. The two-story house was built by architect Peter R. Schmidt in 1880, for German-born businessperson Frederick D. Stadtmuller (c. 1834—1893). It is an example of a late stage 19th-century Italianate architecture, with elaborate decoration, portico, and defined bay windows.

Stadtmuller had owned mercantile stores, named "Stadtmuller & Co." and he imported and sold timber and alcohol.

See also 

 List of San Francisco Designated Landmarks
 National Register of Historic Places listings in San Francisco

References 

1880s architecture in the United States
San Francisco Designated Landmarks
California Historical Landmarks
National Register of Historic Places in San Francisco
Italianate architecture in California
Western Addition, San Francisco
Houses completed in 1880
Houses on the National Register of Historic Places in San Francisco